Alla Polyakova (born November 26th, 1970, in Ryazan) is a Russian political figure, entrepreneur, and a deputy of the 8th State Duma. 

Starting from the second half of the 1990s, Polyakova held senior positions in different commercial enterprises. From 2002 to 2011, she headed the major wholesale supplier of textile products named "Solzhers." Since September 2021, she has served as deputy of the 8th State Duma.

Polyakova is allegedly a sister of a former Russian Ambassador to Belarus (2018-2019) Mikhail Babich. 

In 2019, Forbes included Polyakova in the list of the 100 wealthiest Russian deputies and civil servants.

References

1970 births
Living people
United Russia politicians
21st-century Russian politicians
Eighth convocation members of the State Duma (Russian Federation)
21st-century Russian women politicians